Grafton is a coastal town close to the peninsula, in the Western Area Rural District of Sierra Leone. Grafton is a trade center and lies about twenty miles on the main highway to Freetown.

Grafton is a principle home of the Creole ethnic group, and the Creole people are by far the largest inhabitant of Grafton. The Krio language is the primary language of communication and the most widely spoken language in Grafton.

Although part of the larger Western Area Rural District Council, Grafton has its own locally directly elected Town Council, headed by a Town Head. 
The current Town Head of Grafton is  Ekundayo Conteh

References

External links
http://news.sl/drwebsite/exec/view.cgi?archive=7&num=19419 
https://web.archive.org/web/20121026113630/http://www.sierraexpressmedia.com/archives/48992
https://web.archive.org/web/20111224220109/http://victory.vwcblogs.com/archives/3637
http://www.irinnews.org/Report/78853/SIERRA-LEONE-Sex-crimes-continue-in-peacetime

Populated places in Sierra Leone
Western Area
Sierra Leone Liberated African villages
Populated places established by Sierra Leone Creoles